Immaneni Sathyamurthy is an Indian cardiologist and the director of the department of cardiology at Apollo Hospitals, Chennai. A former member of faculty at the Christian Medical College & Hospital, Vellore, he is known to be a specialist in interventional cardiology. He is credited with several publications, some of which have been prescribed as text for medical courses. He was honored by the Government of India, in 2000, with the fourth highest Indian civilian award of Padma Shri.

References

Recipients of the Padma Shri in medicine
Indian cardiologists
Medical doctors from Chennai
Living people
20th-century Indian medical doctors
Year of birth missing (living people)